Tischbein is a German surname. It may refer to:

Various painters, engravers, lithographers etc., from the Tischbein family of artists,  originating in Haina, Germany.
Notable non-artists from the same family:
Albrecht Tischbein (1803-1881), German engineer and shipbuilder
Peter Friedrich Ludwig Tischbein (1813–1883), German forester, paleontologist and entomologist
Emil Tischbein, the title character in Emil and the Detectives by Erich Kästner
Willy Tischbein (1871-1946), German industrialist and professional cyclist

German-language surnames